King-kong Lam is a TVB actor  born in Hong Kong, 13 October 1970. He previously played comedic characters, and now recently villains.

Accident
In August 2000, he was caught drunk driving. The incident caused a fire and small explosion. Luckily, there were no casualties.

Television series
When Lanes Merge
A Fistful of Stances
A Watchdog's Tale
Beyond the Realm of Conscience
When Easterly Showers Fall on the Sunny West
The Four
Speech of Silence
The Money-Maker Recipe
Forensic Heroes II
A Journey Called Life
The Gentle Crackdown II
The Ultimate Crime Fighter
Men Don't Cry
On the First Beat
War and Destiny
Life Art
Treasure Raiders
Face to Fate
Land of Wealth
Net Deception
A Pillow Case of Mystery
Real Kung Fu
Women on the Run
Misleading Track
Guts of Man
The Academy
The Prince's Shadow
My Family
To Catch the Uncatchable
Seed of Hope
Virtues of Harmony II
Vigilante Force
Take My Word For It
Burning Flame II
A Step into the Past
Armed Reaction III
Justice Sung II
Man's Best Friend
Sergeant Tabloid

Film
Cold War 2 (2016)

References

TVB veteran actors
Hong Kong male actors
Living people
1970 births